1391 Carelia is a stony background asteroid from the central region of the asteroid belt. It was discovered on 16 February 1936, by Finnish astronomer Yrjö Väisälä at Turku Observatory in Southwest Finland. It was named for the Northeast European region of Karelia.

Orbit and classification 

Carelia is a non-family asteroid of the main belt's background population when applying the hierarchical clustering method to its proper orbital elements. It orbits the Sun in the central main-belt at a distance of 2.1–3.0 AU once every 4 years and 1 month (1,485 days; semi-major axis of 2.55 AU). Its orbit has an eccentricity of 0.16 and an inclination of 8° with respect to the ecliptic. It was first observed at Heidelberg Observatory, extending the body's observation arc by 2 days prior to its official discovery observation at Turku.

Naming 

This minor planet was named after the northeastern European region of Karelia, located between the Gulf of Finland and the Russian White Sea. The  was mentioned in The Names of the Minor Planets by Paul Herget in 1955. Since the Winter War between the Soviet Union and Finland in 1939–40, most of the regions belongs now to Russia. A large part of Yrjö Väisälä's discoveries have names that are in some form or another related to that war about Karelia.

Physical characteristics 

In the Tholen taxonomy, Carelia is a stony S-type asteroid, the most common type in the inner main-belt. The asteroid is also an S-type in the SDSS-based taxonomy.

Rotation and pole 

In 2016, a rotational lightcurve of Carelia was published using modeled photometric data from the Lowell Photometric Database (LPD). Lightcurve analysis gave a rotation period of  hours, as well as two spin axes at (21.0°, −79.0°) and (208.0°, −43.0°) in ecliptic coordinates (λ, β).

Diameter and albedo 

According to the survey carried out by NASA's Wide-field Infrared Survey Explorer with its subsequent NEOWISE mission, Carelia measures 11.079 and 11.570 kilometers in diameter and its surface has an albedo of 0.1972 and 0.214, respectively. The Collaborative Asteroid Lightcurve Link assumes a standard albedo for stony asteroids of 0.20 and calculates a diameter of 11.46 kilometers based on an absolute magnitude of 12.07.

References

External links 
 Lightcurve Database Query (LCDB), at www.minorplanet.info
 Dictionary of Minor Planet Names, Google books
 Asteroids and comets rotation curves, CdR – Geneva Observatory, Raoul Behrend
 Discovery Circumstances: Numbered Minor Planets (1)-(5000) – Minor Planet Center
 
 

001391
Discoveries by Yrjö Väisälä
Named minor planets
001391
19360216